Strabena triophthalma is a butterfly in the family Nymphalidae. It is found on Madagascar. The habitat consists of forests and forest margins.

References

Strabena
Butterflies described in 1885
Endemic fauna of Madagascar
Butterflies of Africa
Taxa named by Paul Mabille